The ČKD ČME3 is a six-axle diesel-electric locomotive built by ČKD. The class was used primarily for shunting and mainline duties. With over 8,000 produced during a production run of 31 years, it is one of the most produced locomotives in the world. Units have been operated by Russia, Belarus, Ukraine (as class ЧМЭ3, transliteration ChME3) and other ex-Soviet bloc countries, in Czechoslovakia (as class T669.0, T669.1 and T669.5, later as ŽSR 770 and ČD 770 in Slovakia and the Czech Republic), on industrial railways in Poland (S200), in Albania (HSH T669.1), Iraq (DES 3101), Syria (LDE 1500) and in India (DEC 120).

The ČKD ČME3 is classified as a Co-Co or C-C diesel-electric locomotive, with all six axles powered. As such, it is particularly suited for pulling heavy, slow freight and cargo trains.

References

Sources
 
 
 
 , English-language version 
 , English-language version 
 
 
 

Diesel-electric locomotives of the Soviet Union
Diesel-electric locomotives of Russia
Railway locomotives introduced in 1963
ChME3
Standard gauge locomotives of Czechoslovakia
5 ft 6 in gauge locomotives
5 ft gauge locomotives
Standard gauge locomotives of the Czech Republic
Standard gauge locomotives of Slovakia
Standard gauge locomotives of Albania
Diesel-electric locomotives of Czechoslovakia
Diesel-electric locomotives of the Czech Republic
Diesel-electric locomotives of Albania
Diesel-electric locomotives of Slovakia

pl:S200#W ZSRR